Matum is a sub-district in the Phrom Phiram District of Phitsanulok Province, Thailand. Matum is the Thai word for bael.

Geography
Matum lies in the Nan Basin, which is part of the Chao Phraya watershed.

Administration
The following is a list of the sub-district's mubans (villages):

References

Tambon of Phitsanulok province
Populated places in Phitsanulok province